Dillwynia parvifolia is a species of flowering plant in the family Fabaceae and is endemic to New South Wales. It is a spreading to erect shrub with twisted, narrow oblong leaves and yellow flowers with red markings.

Description

Taxonomy and naming
Dillwynia parvifolia was first formally described in 1812 by John Sims in the Botanical Magazine from an unpublished description by Robert Brown. The specific epithet (parvifolia) means "small-leaved".

Distribution and habitat
This dillwynia grows in forest on the coast and tablelands from the Cumberland Plain to the Clyde River.

References

parvifolia
Flora of New South Wales
Plants described in 1812
Taxa named by John Sims (taxonomist)